Fethaland or Fedeland is an abandoned settlement at the extreme north end of Mainland, Shetland. It was the site of the largest Haaf fishing station in Shetland.

Etymology 
The name Fethaland derives from Old Norse and means rich pasture (literally "fat land"). There is a tradition that the name comes from the Picts who supposedly were forcibly removed from Fethaland, which was their last refuge. Upon being forced out to sea, they called out, "Fae da land, fae da land" (from the land), however this story is most likely apocryphal considering the shout is well-formed modern Shetland Dialect, which wouldn't have been spoken by the picts.

Geography and geology 
Fethaland, along with the more of the north tip of Mainland including Uyea is one part of the Shetland National Scenic Area. It is also a Site of Special Scientific Interest.

Fishing station 

Oil lamps made from common whelk shells, (known locally as "buckies") were used by haaf fishermen in their böds. An example of one from Fethaland was collected by ethnographer Dr Arthur Mitchell and is kept in the Shetland Museum. Commenting on the lamp, Mitchell proposed, ...every one will admit that the lamp is elegant and pretty. Nothing, however, but the fact that it is easily obtained leads the deep-sea fisherman at his station on Fetheland Point to employ a shell for a [lamp]. His doing so does not prove the existence in him of a sense of the beautiful, nor, on the other hand, does his coarsely made sinker prove the reverse.

On 10 October 1994 the Fethaland fishing station was designated as a scheduled monument.

Due to the risk of erosion damaging the site a survey of the fishing station including the use of laser scanning took place in August 2010.

Notes

References

Sources

External links 
 Open Virtual Worlds - a 3d reconstruction of what Fethaland would have looked like in the 1890s.

Fishing history of Shetland
Sites of Special Scientific Interest in Shetland
Archaeological sites in Shetland
Lighthouses in Shetland